Paul Tratt was an American football player and coach. He served as the head football coach at Grinnell College in Grinnell, Iowa in 1901 and the University of Wisconsin–Whitewater in 1904.

He was a college football player and four-year letter winner at the University of Wisconsin.

References

Year of birth missing
Year of death missing
American football quarterbacks
Grinnell Pioneers football coaches
Wisconsin Badgers football players
Wisconsin–Whitewater Warhawks football coaches